Mohammad Shamsur Rahman (born 5 June 1988) is a Bangladeshi cricketer who plays as a right-handed batsman and right arm medium pace bowler. He has represented Bangladesh at international level. He is also known by his nickname Shuvo.

Early and domestic career
Between 2004 and 2006, Shamsur represented the Bangladesh under-19 team in both Under-19 Tests and One-Day International matches. In 2006, he was a member of the Bangladesh squad at the 2006 Under-19 Cricket World Cup.

Shamsur made his first-class debut in 2005 playing for the Bangladesh Cricket Board President's XI against the touring Zimbabwean team.

He made his debut for Khulna Division in 2005/06 and moved on to Dhaka Division in 2006/07. He also appeared for the Bangladesh Cricket Board President's XI in 2004/05 and Bangladesh A in the same season and represented his country in various age group sides, including in Under 19 'Test' and One Day International matches.

In January 2014, Shamsur made 247, the third highest first-class score in Bangladesh at that point. Shortly after this, he was selected in the Bangladesh Test team, making his debut on 27 January against Sri Lanka.

He was the leading run-scorer for Mohammedan Sporting Club in the 2017–18 Dhaka Premier Division Cricket League, with 458 runs in 11 matches.

In October 2018, he was named in the squad for the Comilla Victorians team, following the draft for the 2018–19 Bangladesh Premier League. He was the leading run-scorer for Gazi Group Cricketers in the 2018–19 Dhaka Premier Division Cricket League tournament, with 374 runs in 11 matches. In November 2019, he was selected to play for the Khulna Tigers in the 2019–20 Bangladesh Premier League.

International career
He made his Twenty20 international debut on 31 March 2013 against Sri Lanka at Pallekelle.

References

1988 births
Living people
Bangladeshi cricketers
Bangladesh Test cricketers
Bangladesh One Day International cricketers
Bangladesh Twenty20 International cricketers
Khulna Division cricketers
Dhaka Division cricketers
Asian Games gold medalists for Bangladesh
Asian Games bronze medalists for Bangladesh
Asian Games medalists in cricket
Cricketers at the 2010 Asian Games
Cricketers at the 2014 Asian Games
Rangpur Riders cricketers
Chattogram Challengers cricketers
Dhaka Dominators cricketers
Gazi Group cricketers
Mohammedan Sporting Club cricketers
Abahani Limited cricketers
Bangladesh Central Zone cricketers
Medalists at the 2010 Asian Games
Medalists at the 2014 Asian Games
Comilla Victorians cricketers
Wicket-keepers
People from Comilla